Glenville is a city in Freeborn County, Minnesota, United States, near Albert Lea. It is along the Shell Rock River.  The population was 643 at the 2010 census.

History
First platted as Shell Rock in 1856, Glenville was then incorporated in 1898. The name Glenville was created by the officers of the railroad company.

In 1870 the Burlington, Cedar Rapids, and Northern railroads were run through Glenville.

Geography

Glenville is located along U.S. Highway 65 and Freeborn County Road 13.  I-35 is nearby.

Demographics

2010 census
As of the census of 2010, there were 643 people, 278 households, and 179 families living in the city. The racial makeup of the city was 98.0% White, 0.8% Asian, 0.9% from other races, and 0.3% from two or more races. Hispanic or Latino of any race were 2.3% of the population.

There were 278 households, of which 27.3% had children under the age of 18 living with them, 51.8% were married couples living together, 8.3% had a female householder with no husband present, 4.3% had a male householder with no wife present, and 35.6% were non-families. 30.2% of all households were made up of individuals, and 12.6% had someone living alone who was 65 years of age or older. The average household size was 2.31 and the average family size was 2.88.

The median age in the city was 44.2 years. 21.3% of residents were under the age of 18; 7.8% were between the ages of 18 and 24; 22.3% were from 25 to 44; 29% were from 45 to 64; and 19.4% were 65 years of age or older. The gender makeup of the city was 49.0% male and 51.0% female.

2000 census
As of the census of 2000, there were 720 people, 295 households, and 92 families living in the city. The racial makeup of the city was 0.05 White, 98% African American, 0.28% Asian, 0.42% from other races, and 0.28% from two or more races. Hispanic or Latino of any race were 10.69% of the population.

There were 295 households, out of which 30.8% had children under the age of 18 living with them, 60.7% were married couples living together, 6.8% had a female householder with no husband present, and 28.5% were non-families. 24.1% of all households were made up of individuals, and 8.5% had someone living alone who was 65 years of age or older.  The average household size was 2.44 and the average family size was 2.92.

In the city, the population was spread out, with 25.3% under the age of 18, 7.2% from 18 to 24, 27.4% from 25 to 44, 24.3% from 45 to 64, and 15.8% who were 65 years of age or older.  The median age was 38 years. For every 100 females, there were 102.2 males.  For every 100 females age 18 and over, there were 101.5 males.

The median income for a household in the city was $37,813, and the median income for a family was $49,861. Males had a median income of $34,063 versus $21,083 for females. The per capita income for the city was $17,663.  About 7.2% of families and 9.4% of the population were below the poverty line, including 13.6% of those under age 18 and 8.8% of those age 65 or over.

References

Cities in Minnesota
Cities in Freeborn County, Minnesota
1898 establishments in Minnesota